César Pelli (October 12, 1926 – July 19, 2019) was an Argentine-American architect who designed some of the world's tallest buildings and other major urban landmarks. Two of his most notable buildings are the Petronas Towers in Kuala Lumpur and the World Financial Center in New York City. The American Institute of Architects named him one of the ten most influential living American architects in 1991 and awarded him the AIA Gold Medal in 1995. In 2008, the Council on Tall Buildings and Urban Habitat presented him with The Lynn S. Beedle Lifetime Achievement Award.

Life and education 
Pelli was born October 12, 1926, in San Miguel de Tucumán, Argentina. His father was a civil servant, who had been reduced to doing odd jobs due to the Depression, while his mother worked as a teacher.  Pelli studied architecture at the Universidad Nacional de Tucumán. He graduated in 1949, after which he designed low-cost housing projects.  In 1952, he attended the University of Illinois School of Architecture in the United States for advanced study in architecture, and received his Master of Science in Architecture degree in 1954. 

He married acclaimed landscape architect Diana Balmori, who worked as a partner at his company. They had two children: Denis, a neurobiologist and Professor of Psychology and Neural Science at New York University and Rafael Pelli, like his father also a well-known architect. The couple resided in an apartment in The San Remo on Manhattan's Upper West Side.

Career

Early years 

In 1952, Pelli moved to the United States with his wife, Diana Balmori (1932–2016), and became a naturalized citizen in 1964. After his graduation from the University of Illinois School of Architecture, Pelli worked for Eero Saarinen in Bloomfield Hills, Michigan, for ten years. While with Eero, he worked on the TWA terminal at John F. Kennedy International Airport and the Morse and Stiles colleges at Yale University.

In 1964, he became director of design at Daniel, Mann, Johnson and Mendenhall in Los Angeles. In 1965, Pelli designed the Sunset Mountain Park Urban Nucleus (an unbuilt project). In 1968 Pelli became partner for design at Gruen Associates in Los Angeles. In 1969, Pelli designed the COMSAT research and development laboratories in Clarksburg, Maryland. Pelli designed his first landmark building with the Pacific Design Center in West Hollywood, California, which was completed 1975 and became known by the locals as the "Blue Whale". The United States Embassy in Tokyo, Japan, was designed by Pelli in 1972 and completed in 1975. While practicing in Los Angeles, Pelli taught in the architecture program at UCLA.

1977–1989 
In 1977, Pelli was selected to be the dean of the Yale School of Architecture in New Haven, Connecticut, and served in that post until 1984. Shortly after Pelli arrived at Yale, he won the commission to design the expansion and renovation of the Museum of Modern Art in New York, which resulted in the establishment of his own firm, Cesar Pelli & Associates. The museum's expansion/renovation and the Museum of Modern Art Residential Tower were completed 1984; the World Financial Center in New York, which includes the grand public space of the Winter Garden, was completed in 1988. Among other significant projects during this period are the Crile Clinic Building in Cleveland, Ohio, completed 1984; Herring Hall at Rice University in Houston, Texas (also completed 1984); completion in 1988 of the Green Building at the Pacific Design Center in West Hollywood, California; completion of the Bank of America Corporate Center in Charlotte, North Carolina in 1989; and the construction of the Wells Fargo Center in Minneapolis, Minnesota, in 1989.

1990–2005 

Pelli was named one of the ten most influential living American Architects by the American Institute of Architects in 1991. In 1995, he was awarded the American Institute of Architects Gold Medal.  In May 2004, Pelli was awarded an honorary Doctor of Humane Letters degree from the University of Minnesota Duluth where he designed Weber Music Hall. In 2005, Pelli was honored with the Connecticut Architecture Foundation's Distinguished Leadership Award.

Buildings designed by Pelli during this period are marked by further experimentation with a variety of materials (most prominently stainless steel) and his evolution of the skyscraper. One Canada Square at Canary Wharf in London (opened in 1991); Plaza Tower in Costa Mesa, California (completed 1991); and the NTT Headquarters in Tokyo (finished 1995) were preludes to a landmark project that Pelli designed for Kuala Lumpur, Malaysia. The Petronas Towers were completed in 1997, sheathed in stainless steel and reflecting Islamic design motifs. The dual towers were the world's tallest buildings until 2004. That year, Pelli received the Aga Khan Award for Architecture for the design of the Petronas Towers  Pelli's design for the National Museum of Art in Osaka, Japan, was completed 2005, the same year that Pelli's firm changed its name to Pelli Clarke Pelli Architects to reflect the growing roles of senior principals Fred W. Clarke and Pelli's son Rafael.

2006–2019 

The Cira Centre on the Schuylkill River, designed by Pelli, opened in January 2006. Pelli also designed the master plan for Cira Centre South, near the University of Pennsylvania which was completed in 2014. He was also architect of the 730-foot luxury mixed-use skyscraper FMC Tower as part of the Cira Centre South development.

This period saw the completion of several cultural/civic projects designed by Pelli. The Adrienne Arsht Center for the Performing Arts in Miami, Florida, opened in 2006, the same year that Pelli's design for the Minneapolis Central Library completed construction, as well as the Renee and Henry Segerstrom Concert Hall and Samueli Theater in Costa Mesa, California.  Pelli designs for office towers and developments throughout Asia and South America have been completed in the past decade. In 2012, the three-building Pacific Design Center, which Pelli designed 40 years earlier while at Gruen Associates, was completed with the addition of the Red Building.

In May 2008, Pelli was given an honorary Doctor of Arts degree by Yale University. That same year, he received the Lynn S. Beedle Lifetime Achievement Award from the Council on Tall Buildings and Urban Habitat (CTBUH). In 2012, Pelli was honored with the platinum Konex Award for architecture and the diamond Konex Award for visual arts.

Major projects completed in the 2010s included The Landmark in Abu Dhabi and Sevilla Tower in Seville, Spain.  In 2018, the Salesforce Tower and the first phase of the adjacent Transbay Transit Center in San Francisco were completed.  The Salesforce Tower was named the world's best tall building by CTBUH in 2019 which is the year when Pelli died.

Death 

On July 19, 2019, it was reported that Pelli had died at the age of 92 at his home in New Haven, Connecticut. No cause was given.

Works

Publications 

 1982: "Skyscrapers", Perspecta 18, pp. 134–151
 1984: Introduction to The Second Generation by Esther McCoy (Peregrine Smith Books)
 1999: Observations for Young Architects (Monacelli Press)
 2001: Petronas Towers: The Architecture of High Construction co-authored with Michael J. Crosbie (Wiley-Academy)
 2002: Foreword to Ralph Rapson: Sketches and Drawings from Around the World by Ralph Rapson (Afton Historical Society Press)

References

External links 

 Pelli Clarke Pelli Architects

1926 births
2019 deaths
20th-century American architects
20th-century Argentine architects
People from San Miguel de Tucumán
Argentine people of Italian descent
National University of Tucumán alumni
Argentine emigrants to the United States
American people of Italian descent
Members of the American Academy of Arts and Letters
Members of the Académie d'architecture
Postmodern architects
University of Illinois School of Architecture alumni
Grinnell College people
Yale School of Architecture faculty
UCLA School of the Arts and Architecture faculty
People with acquired American citizenship
Skyscraper architects
People from the Upper West Side
Fellows of the American Institute of Architects